Make a Sound is the debut album by American rock band Autopilot Off. It was produced by then-Sum 41 producer and manager Greig Nori.

Release
In February 2004, it was announced for release in two months' time. On February 23, 2004, "What I Want" was posted online; it was released on a split single with Fall Out Boy on March 23, 2004. The music video for "What I Want" was posted online on four days later. Make a Sound was released on April 13 through Island Records. In April and May, the group supported Rufio on their headlining US tour, which included an appearance at the Skate and Surf Festival. They played a handful of dates with Authority Zero and Pennywise. On May 18, 2004, the band appeared on The Late Late Show. They then embarked on a US headlining tour with Riddlin' Kids and Bayside. Autopilot Off appeared on IMX on June 16, 2004. Prior to a Japanese tour with the Offspring, drummer Phil Robinson got married; Ben Lythberg of Snapcase filled in his role. Upon returning to the US, they played shows with Squad Five-O, theStart and A Second Chance, and appeared at the Just Play Games Festival. They performed across the US on the Projekt Revolution tour until September 2004.

Track listing

Personnel

Autopilot Off
 Chris Johnson – Lead vocals, rhythm guitar
 Chris Hughes – Lead guitar, backing vocals
 Rob Kucharek – Bass guitar, backing vocals
 Phil Robinson – Drums

Artwork
 Rob Kucharek – Design, layout design
 Andrew Forgash – Photography

Additional musicians
 Tim Armstrong – Co-writing on "Blind Truth" & "What I Want"
 Michael "Elvis" Baskette – Additional Guitars
 Ed Krautner – Piano
 Greig Nori – Co-writing on "Clockwork"

Production
 Greig Nori, Chris Johnson, & John Naclerio – Producers
 Zach Blackstone, C.J. Buscaglia, Steve Chahley, & Damien Shannon	 – Assistants
 Ed Krautner, Roger Lian – Digital Editing
 Matt Hyde – Drum Engineering
 Gersh & Joe Nicholson – Drum Technician
 Michael "Elvis" Baskette, Femio Hernández, Matt Hyde, Ed Krautner, & John Naclerio, – Engineers
 Justin Huth & Stephen Looker – Guitar Technician
 Howie Weinberg – Mastering at Masterdisk, NYC
 Tom Lord-Alge – Mixing on tracks: 1, 5, 9-12
 Randy Staub –  Mixing on tracks: 2-4, 6-8
 Andrew Huggins – Recording Administration

Charts

Other versions
The Japanese version of Make a Sound includes a bonus track titled "Raise Your Rifles". There is also a limited edition print of the album, that, as well as the Japanese bonus track, includes two additional exclusive songs.

Use in media
"Make A Sound" appears in the soundtrack for Burnout 3: Takedown, "Chromatic Fades" in NASCAR Thunder 2004, "Clockwork" in NHL 2004 (however is misspelled as "Clockworks") and SSX 3, and "What I Want" in Test Drive: Eve of Destruction and Cars.

References

2004 debut albums
Autopilot Off albums
Albums produced by Greig Nori
Island Records albums